Gianfrancesco Bembo may refer to:
 Giovanni Francesco Bembo ( 1515–1543), Italian Renaissance painter
 Gianfrancesco Bembo (bishop) (1659–1720), Roman Catholic prelate